Luke Donald McDonald (born 9 February 1995) is an Australian rules footballer who plays for the North Melbourne Football Club in the Australian Football League (AFL). He was recruited under the Father-son rule with the eighth selection in the 2013 national draft. His father, Donald McDonald played 155 games for North Melbourne and was working in the club's football department until he left to avoid any conflict of interest.

Early life
McDonald participated in the Auskick program at Kew-Victoria Park. He played his junior football with the Kew Comets (YJFL) and his senior football at the Werribee (VFL) whilst also playing for the Oakleigh Chargers (NAB League) from which he was drafted by the North Melbourne Football Club at No. 8 in the 2013 National Draft.

AFL career

North Melbourne (2014-)
McDonald played VFL for North Melbourne affiliate Werribee during the 2013 season and attended North's preseason training camp in Utah. He made his debut in the opening round of 2014 against Essendon and played in all but 1 game of that season including the finals campaign. He was voted 3rd in Rising Star award behind Western Bulldogs' Marcus Bontempelli and Brisbane Lions' Lewis Taylor. McDonald played in the 2014 AFL finals series including North's elimination final win against Essendon, semi final win against Geelong where he was named in the bests picking up 20 disposals. McDonald also participated in North's heavy preliminary final defeat to the Sydney Swans at ANZ Stadium.

In February 2015, McDonald revealed that he had suffered a stress fracture to his back during a match against the Brisbane Lions in Round 15 of the previous season. The injury threatened to develop into a fracture-proper and McDonald was unable to train between games. Despite his injury concerns, he was noted in the media for several acts of courage on the field especially a tendency to 'go back with the flight of the ball'.

During North Melbourne's 2015 season McDonald played 14 games, kicking his first goal in North's Semi Final win over the Sydney Swans at ANZ Stadium. While many commentators called McDonald's 2015 season disappointing including McDonald himself, in 2016 he regained form as well as his place in the team's best 22. In a round 13 Friday night game however, during a chase-down run of Hawthorn's small forward Cyril Rioli, McDonald injured his hamstring sidelining him for 10 weeks.

During 2016, McDonald signed a contract with North Melbourne, keeping him with the club until the end of 2018.

Statistics
 Statistics are correct to end of 2015 season

|- style="background-color: #EAEAEA"
! scope="row" style="text-align:center" | 2014
|style="text-align:center;"|
|21||23||0||6||207||182||389||86||59||0||0.26||9||7.91||16.91||3.74||2.57
|-
! scope="row" style="text-align:center" | 2015
|style="text-align:center;"|
|21||14||1||0||105||97||202||44||27||0.07||0||7.5||6.93||14.43||3.14||1.93|1.93
|}

References

External links

1995 births
Living people
North Melbourne Football Club players
Werribee Football Club players
Oakleigh Chargers players
Australian rules footballers from Victoria (Australia)
People educated at Trinity Grammar School, Kew